The Isa-e Church  is a denomination Reformed Presbyterian in Bangladesh and India. It was founded in 1999 by Abdul Mabud Chowdhury, an ex-Muslim convert to Christianity.

History 
In 1985, Abdul Mabud Chowdhury, an ex-Muslim, converted to Christianity. After living abroad and becoming a pastor, Abdul returned to Bangladesh in 1997.

However, meeting with a group of former ex-Muslims, he acknowledged that the country's Christian denominations were culturally disconnected from the country's majority population. Chowdhury then begin working on establishing a church that adopts Bengali culture as tool of evangelization in the country.

On September 2, 1999, she was formed  in Jamat Isa-e Bangladesh. Later, a denomination adopted the name "Isa-e Church Bangladesh".

The denomination soon spread across the country. As of 2015, it had 6,000  members in 127 local churches.

The Isa-e Theological Institute was founded by the denomination, which serves to prepare new pastors and leaders.

Doctrine 
The appellation affirms the Five Solae, practices pedobaptism, and adheres to Reformed Tradition.

Inter-ecclesiastical Relations 
The church is a member of the World Reformed Fellowship and has relations with the Reformed Churches in the Netherlands (Liberated).

References 

Reformed denominations in Asia
Members of the World Reformed Fellowship
Presbyterian denominations in Asia